Putaqa Wayi (Quechua putaqa Rumex peruanus, Ancash Quechua wayi house, "putaqa house", also spelled Putajahuay) is a mountain in the Andes of Peru which reaches a height of approximately . It is located in the Junín Region, Tarma Province, Cajas District.

References 

Mountains of Peru
Mountains of Junín Region